Gheorghe Nichita (born  September 15, 1956) is a Romanian politician, who  has served as the mayor of Iaşi since 2003, and suspended (as of May 2015) over allegations of corruption. A member of the Social Democratic Party, Nichita is the national vice-president of the party, and the leader of the party’s county organization.

Personal life
Nichita was born in Dorohoi, and trained in Engineering at the Politehnica University in Bucharest (1976–1979), in Economics at the University of Iaşi (1982–1987), and in Hydrotechnics at the Gheorghe Asachi Technical University (1991–1995), and has been employed by the Iaşi public administration since 1979.

Political career
In 1995-2000, Nichita was a member of the Democratic Party. In 1996-1998, and 2000-2003, he was also a member of the city council. Nichita made two unsuccessful runs for mayor of Iași, in 1996, and 2000.

In 2000, Nichita switched to the Social Democratic Party, and three years later became the interim mayor after his predecessor, Constantin Simirad (in office 1991-2003), was appointed Romanian ambassador to Cuba by President Ion Iliescu. In 2004, he was elected as the mayor of Iaşi, and then re-elected in 2008 and 2012.

Corruption allegations
On 1 May 2015, Gheorghe Nichita had been detained during the night by the National Anticorruption Directorate (DNA), after more than seven hours of hearings on suspicion of abuse of office. Next day, a court ruled he would be investigated under judicial control, meaning he is banned from leaving the city and has to report to police. On 9 May 2015, Gheorghe Nichita had been placed under house arrest.

Gheorghe Nichita is suspected that he abused his position by using local police officers to spy and report on rivals and his girlfriend. Three senior local police officers were also detained. Prosecutors said Nichita abusively obtained confidential information, using police and city hall employees, for personal gain.

On 22 May 2015, Nichita was suspended from his job as mayor of the city.
Mihai Ceausu ( 17 years old that time) was the person who called the police for him , after G.Nichita refused a festival project on his name.

References

External links
 Gheorghe Nichita's blog
  Gheorghe Nichita va fi primar interimar al Iasului 
  Gheorghe Nichita, în an electoral: 70.000 RON, în depozite, şi o maşină nou-nouţă, în garaj

1956 births
Living people
Mayors of Iași
Social Democratic Party (Romania) politicians
People from Dorohoi
Alexandru Ioan Cuza University alumni
Politehnica University of Bucharest alumni